is a Japanese seinen manga magazine. The magazine was established in 1988. It is published by Akita Shoten and has its headquarters in Tokyo.

History

Manga series
 Alien Nine by Hitoshi Tomizawa (1998-1999)
 Babel II: The Returner by Takashi Noguchi
 Battle Royale by Masayuki Taguchi and Koushun Takami
 Battle Royale: Angels' Border by Mioko Ōnishi and Koushun Takami
 Battle Royale II: Blitz Royale (BR2/ブリッツ・ロワイアル) by Hitoshi Tomizawa and Koushun Takami (2003-2004)
 Black Joke by Rintaro Koike and Masayuki Taguchi
 Cutie Honey Seed by Go Nagai and Komugi Hoshino
 Gaki Rock by Daiju Yamauchi
 Gichi Gichi-kun (ギチギチくん) by Suehiro Maruo
 Ibitsu, by Kazuto Okada 
  by Ira Ishida and Sena Aritō (2001-2004)
 Inugami Hakase (犬神博士) by Suehiro Maruo
  by Hiroshi Takahashi (September 2016 - ongoing) 
  Kuzu!! by Dai Suzuki
 Love Junkies by Kyo Hatsuki
 Schoolmate by Yuki Azuma
 Sundome by Kazuto Okada
 Tanpen-Renai by Fumi Kanai
 Warau Kyūketsuki (笑う吸血鬼, "Laughing Vampire") by Suehiro Maruo (1998-1999, 2003)
 Young Black Jack by Yū-Go Ōkuma and Yoshiaki Tabata (2011-2019)

References

External links

1988 establishments in Japan
Akita Shoten magazines
Magazines established in 1988
Magazines published in Tokyo
Seinen manga magazines